Pseudomonas frederiksbergensis is a Gram-negative, phenanthrene-degrading bacterium from a coal gasification site in Frederiksberg, Copenhagen, Denmark. It is able to catalyse the asymmetric oxidation of sulfides to give exclusively the R enantiomer. The type strain is DSM 13022.

References

External links
Type strain of Pseudomonas frederiksbergensis at BacDive -  the Bacterial Diversity Metadatabase

Pseudomonadales
Bacteria described in 2000